The Ashby Canal Trust is a waterway society based at Measham, Swadlincote, Leicestershire, England, UK, and concerned with the restoration of a part of the Ashby Canal, also known as the Ashby-de-la-Zouch Canal.
The restoration project is funded by:                                 
Leicestershire County Council
Ashby Canal Association
Ashby Canal Trust and Ashby Canal Trust Supporters
Community Foundation                                              
East Midlands Development Agency                                    
Inland Waterways Association
Measham Development Trust
National Forest Company

Since 2009, the Inland Waterways Association has held an annual National Trailboat Festival on the restored length of the Ashby Canal at Moira, at the most northern end of the canal in Leicestershire. The IWA allocated the Festival there to "showcase the work carried out by the Ashby Canal Trust and raise awareness for the continuing restoration".

See also
Ashby Canal Association
National Forest
List of waterway societies in the United Kingdom

External links
UK Government, House of Commons Select Committee on Environment, Food and Rural Affairs: Memorandum submitted by Ashby Canal Trust, February 2008: "Canals cannot be restored on voluntary effort alone"
BBC Breathing Places: Ashby Canal, Moira - Volunteering with Ashby Canal Trust
Leicestershire County Council Press Release 15 February 2006, "Work starts on Ashby Canal" 
Leicestershire Parish Councils website: listing Ashby Canal Trust 
British Waterways' leisure website "Waterscape": page on Inland Waterways Association's National Trailboat Festival 2009, showcasing the restoration of the northern section of the canal
"Wild Over Waterways" Information Pack, teaching resource about the Ashby Canal restoration (pdf)
Ashby Canal Trust website

Waterways organisations in England